June 18 - Eastern Orthodox Church calendar - June 20

All fixed commemorations below celebrated on July 2 by Orthodox Churches on the Old Calendar.

For June 19th, Orthodox Churches on the Old Calendar commemorate the Saints listed on June 6.

Saints
 Holy Myrrh-bearer Mary, mother of the Apostle James (1st century)
 Holy Apostle Jude, the Brother of the Lord (c. 80)
 Martyr Zosimas the Soldier, of Apollonia, at Antioch in Pisidia  (c. 89-117) 
 Saint Macarius of Petra (4th century)
 Venerable Zeno, hermit, of Egypt, wonderworker (4th century)
 Venerable Paisios the Great of Egypt, the God-bearer (5th century) 
 Saint John the Solitary of Jerusalem (586)
 Hieromartyr Asyncretus, by the sword.

Pre-Schism Western saints
 Martyrs Gervasius and Protasius, the twin sons of martyrs, under Nero (62 or 2nd century)  (see also: October 14 - in the East )
 Saint Ursicinus of Ravenna, a physician of Ravenna, martyred for being a Christian (c. 67)
 Saint Zosimus, a martyr in Spoleto in Umbria in Italy under Trajan (110)
 Saint Gaudentius, Culmatius and Companions, martyred under Valentinian I (364)
 Saint Innocent, Bishop of Le Mans in France for over forty years (559)
 Saint Deodatus of Nevers (Deodatus of Jointures, Dié, Didier, Dieu-Donné, Adéodat), a bishop who founded the monastery of Val-de-Galilée - Jointures in France (c. 680)
 Saint Hildegrim of Châlons, Bishop of Châlons-sur-Marne in France and then Abbot of Werden in Germany (827) 
 Saint Bruno of Querfurt (Bruno-Boniface), a missionary bishop, the second "Apostle of the Prussians" (1009)
 Saint Romuald, Abbot of Camaldoli, Ravenna, and a major figure in the eleventh-century "Renaissance of eremitical asceticism" (1027)

Post-Schism Orthodox saints
 Venerable Barlaam of Shenkursk, monk (1462)
 Saint Job, Patriarch of Moscow (1607)
 Venerable Paisius of Hilendar, the Bulgarian (18th century)
 Saint John (Maximovitch), Archbishop of Shanghai and San Francisco (1966)

Other commemorations
 Repose of Schemamonk Theoktist, desert-dweller, of Valaam (1863)
 Repose of Archbishop Leonty of Chile (1971)

Icon gallery

Notes

References

Sources
 June 19/July 2. Orthodox Calendar (PRAVOSLAVIE.RU).
 July 2 / June 19. HOLY TRINITY RUSSIAN ORTHODOX CHURCH (A parish of the Patriarchate of Moscow).
 June 19. OCA - The Lives of the Saints.
 The Autonomous Orthodox Metropolia of Western Europe and the Americas (ROCOR). St. Hilarion Calendar of Saints for the year of our Lord 2004. St. Hilarion Press (Austin, TX). p. 45.
 The Nineteenth Day of the Month of June. Orthodoxy in China.
 June 19. Latin Saints of the Orthodox Patriarchate of Rome.
 The Roman Martyrology. Transl. by the Archbishop of Baltimore. Last Edition, According to the Copy Printed at Rome in 1914. Revised Edition, with the Imprimatur of His Eminence Cardinal Gibbons. Baltimore: John Murphy Company, 1916. pp. 178–179.
 Rev. Richard Stanton. A Menology of England and Wales, or, Brief Memorials of the Ancient British and English Saints Arranged According to the Calendar, Together with the Martyrs of the 16th and 17th Centuries. London: Burns & Oates, 1892. pp. 275–276.
Greek Sources
 Great Synaxaristes:  19 ΙΟΥΝΙΟΥ. ΜΕΓΑΣ ΣΥΝΑΞΑΡΙΣΤΗΣ.
  Συναξαριστής. 19 Ιουνίου. ECCLESIA.GR. (H ΕΚΚΛΗΣΙΑ ΤΗΣ ΕΛΛΑΔΟΣ). 
  19 Ιουνίου. Αποστολική Διακονία της Εκκλησίας της Ελλάδος (Apostoliki Diakonia of the Church of Greece).
  19/06/2018. Ορθόδοξος Συναξαριστής. 
Russian Sources
  2 июля (19 июня). Православная Энциклопедия под редакцией Патриарха Московского и всея Руси Кирилла (электронная версия). (Orthodox Encyclopedia - Pravenc.ru).
  19 июня по старому стилю / 2 июля по новому стилю. Русская Православная Церковь - Православный церковный календарь на 2017 год.
  19 июня (ст.ст.) 2 июля 2014 (нов. ст.). Русская Православная Церковь Отдел внешних церковных связей. (DECR).

June in the Eastern Orthodox calendar